Alejandro Jordá Candelas (born 19 August 1955) is a Spanish equestrian. He competed in two events at the 1996 Summer Olympics.

Notes

References

1955 births
Living people
Spanish male equestrians
Olympic equestrians of Spain
Equestrians at the 1996 Summer Olympics
Sportspeople from Barcelona